Gratiana is a genus of tortoise beetles in the family Chrysomelidae. There are about seven described species in Gratiana.

Species
These seven species belong to the genus Gratiana:
 Gratiana boliviana Spaeth, 1926 i c g b (tropical soda apple leaf beetle)
 Gratiana conformis (Boheman, 1854) i c g
 Gratiana graminea (Klug, 1829) i c g
 Gratiana insculpta (Boheman, 1855) i c g
 Gratiana lutescens (Boheman, 1854) i c g
 Gratiana pallidula (Boheman, 1854) i c g b (eggplant tortoise beetle)
 Gratiana spadicea (Klug, 1829) i c g
Data sources: i = ITIS, c = Catalogue of Life, g = GBIF, b = Bugguide.net

References

Further reading

External links

 

Cassidinae
Articles created by Qbugbot